Nutrition and Cancer is a peer-reviewed medical journal covering research on the role of nutritional factors in causing or preventing cancer. It is published eight times a year by Routledge. According to the Journal Citation Reports, the journal has a 2014 impact factor of 2.322.

References

External links 
 

Oncology journals
Taylor & Francis academic journals
English-language journals
Publications established in 1978
Nutrition and dietetics journals